is a railway station in the city of Chita, Aichi, Japan, operated by Meitetsu.

Lines

Station layout
The station has two opposed side platforms connected by a level crossing. The station is unattended.

Platforms

Adjacent stations

Station history
Tatsumigaoka Station was opened on July 10, 1955. In July 2006, the Tranpass system of magnetic fare cards with automatic turnstiles were implemented.

Passenger statistics
In fiscal 2017, the station was used by an average of 6,463 passengers daily (boarding passengers only).

Surrounding area
Shinden Elementary School

See also
 List of Railway Stations in Japan

References

External links

 Official web page 

Railway stations in Japan opened in 1955
Railway stations in Aichi Prefecture
Stations of Nagoya Railroad
Chita, Aichi